Matthew Ondler (born April 15, 1963) is the CTO and Director of Spacecraft Development at Axiom Space. Axiom Space is building the world's first commercial space station.  Shortly after Ondler joining Axiom Space, NASA announced the award of $140M contract to Axiom and the exclusive right for Axiom Space to build its space station off the forward port of the ISS.  Previously he was the president and co-founder of Houston Mechatronics. Before that, he was the lead manager of the software, robotics, and simulation division of NASA's Johnson Space Center. Ondler earned his BS in Aerospace Engineering from the University of Colorado in Boulder, CO. He then moved to Houston, TX, where he began a 28 year career at NASA Johnson Space Center.   While at NASA he achieved his MBA in Finance and Marketing from the University of Houston and completed the Senior Executive Fellows Program at Harvard University.

Early life
Ondler was born and raised in Casper Wyoming. He graduated from Natrona County High School, the same high school his parents had graduated from two decades earlier.

Career

NASA
Beginning at NASA, Ondler worked as an aerospace engineer in the Advanced Programs office and worked on the Aeroassist Flight Experiment (AFE), Mars Rover Sample Return, among many other advanced program initiatives. Later he was named Mission Manager for SPIFEX, a primary Space Shuttle experiment that flew aboard STS-64 from 1992 to 1994. Then he became International Integration Manager for Guidance, Navigation and Control (GN&C) for the ISS Program. He created and managed the GN&C Hardware/Software Integration Test Facility in 1996 that is still used to this day. From 1997 to 2001 he was Deputy Branch Chief of the GN&C branch. In 1999 he led the Abort Improvement Team in the Space Shuttle Program office that was chartered with closing all ascent loss of vehicle/loss of crew abort scenarios. This effort led to all abort "black zones" being eliminated. After that assignment Ondler was selected as the Deputy Division Chief of the Aeroscience and Flight Mechanics Division where he served until 2006.  In 2006 he was asked to lead the Biomedical Systems Division, the division was responsible for all crew related health and medical equipment and flew over a 1000 pieces of flight hardware under his tenure. In 2007 Ondler was asked to lead the Software, Robotics and Simulation Division, an organization renowned for its leadership in robotics. Under his tenure the division produced Robonaut2, Lunar Electric Rover, Valkrie, and other robotic breakthroughs.

Ondler then managed NASA's Project Morpheus, a VTVL rocket landing test platform and a project to send a humanoid robot to the moon, based on the operational Robonaut 2. According to SpaceNews, Ondler pitched the mission concept but official support was limited. The project was backed by Johnson Space Center Engineering Director Stephen Altemus. The program using relatively little funding according to Altemus, successfully flew the lander prototype multiple times, demonstrating a low-cost lander was viable. Ondler, in a statement to Space.com, stated that the program in part demonstrated NASA's ability to work efficiently with little resources to build a substantial program.

After 28 years of service Mr. Ondler left NASA as the Assistant Director of Engineering at the Johnson Space Center.

Ondler is the recipient of NASA's Outstanding Leadership Medal and NASA Exceptional Achievement Medal.

Executive work
After his 28 year career at NASA, he performed business & proposal development, strategic planning, program management, lead corporate innovation initiatives, and served as the company deputy chief engineer for Stinger Ghaffarian Technologies, a $600 million-a-year engineering services company.

In March 2014, he co-founded the company Houston Mechatronics, a firm specialized in mechatronics and robotics, where he served as the president and CEO of the corporation and oversaw all company activities and functions. Under his tenure Houston Mechatronics Inc. raised two funding rounds, including a Series B investment of $20M from Schlumberger and Transocean International at a valuation of $60M.  The company developed Aquanaut, a transformative subsea robot designed to perform commercial work in Oil and Gas and to perform critical work for the Department of Defense.

References

1963 births
Living people
American chief executives
NASA people
University of Colorado Boulder alumni
University of Houston alumni